Stephen Kunda (born August 17, 1984) is a Zambian football central defender who is currently a free agent. He played for Power Dynamos F.C. in his home country before moving to Finland. Kunda can also play as a defensive midfielder. Kunda had a contract with RoPS until the end of season 2012.

Kunda was one of the Zambians who came to RoPS in 2007. He came along with Nchimunya Mweetwa, Chanda Mwaba, Chileshe Chibwe and Zeddy Saileti's younger brother Derik Saileti for a trial. Quintet (Mweetwa, Kunda, Chibwe, Mwaba) got contract's with RoPS. Kunda signed with RoPS 3-years long contract including 2-years option. Later season he extended his contract to 2012. After the season RoPS won promotion to Veikkausliiga (Finnish Premier Division).

Originally in RoPS, Kunda was considered to play as a defensive midfielder, but he was later dropped to defence after RoPS had some injuries and bans with their defenders. Kunda performed well in central defence and subsequently, he was made regular central defender. Kunda has good technical skill and keeps cool head even under pressure from opposite players. During the 2010 season Kunda has played in the midfield position, while Jarkko Lahdenmäki has been the starting defender with American Etchu Tabe.

On August 2, 2008, Kunda was chosen as a central defender in the Finnish Premier League's best XI in July.

On 15 November 2008, RoPS informed that Kunda has been loaned to his former club Power Dynamos F.C. and he played some games with Mwaba on guest player status.

He has played once in Zambia's national football team.

Kunda and eight other RoPS players got sacked in the spring of 2011 due to match fixing scandal.

Career statistics

External links
  at rops.fi
  at veikkausliiga.com

References

1984 births
Zambian footballers
Zambian expatriate footballers
Zambia international footballers
Zambian expatriate sportspeople in Finland
Association football central defenders
Expatriate footballers in Finland
Veikkausliiga players
Rovaniemen Palloseura players
Living people